Polyvinyl Record Co. is an American independent record label headquartered in Champaign, Illinois. The label also has satellite offices in New York, Austin, and the Bay Area. Polyvinyl has put out over 400 releases to date.

The Polyvinyl roster currently consists of 30+ active artists, including Alvvays, Xiu Xiu, Jeff Rosenstock, Kero Kero Bonito, and Julia Jacklin as well as longtime label signees like of Montreal, American Football, STRFKR, and Rainer Maria. Recent additions to the Polyvinyl family include Jeff Rosenstock, Laura Jane Grace, Anamanaguchi, IAN SWEET, Oceanator, Chris Farren, Squirrel Flower, and Yumi Zouma.

History

1994-1999

In 1994, high school students Matt Lunsford and Darcie Knight from Danville, Illinois founded Polyvinyl Press, a fanzine created to celebrate the Midwestern D.I.Y. scene. As part of Polyvinyl Press’ third issue in July 1995, Lunsford and Knight released a split 7” featuring Back of Dave and Walker. With the fifth and final issue of Polyvinyl Press in May 1996, Lunsford and Knight put out an accompanying 20-track compilation, Direction, chronicling the current state of mid-‘90s Midwestern D.I.Y and marking the official transition of the fanzine to Polyvinyl Record Co. Lunsford and Knight established a 50/50 profit sharing model for the label.

Early releases, like the debut album from the Direction-featured band Rainer Maria, Past Worn Searching, and Braid’s 1998 album Frame and Canvas, set a national eye on Polyvinyl. The following year, Polyvinyl released American Football’s self-titled debut. This record has grown to be one of the best-selling releases on the label and established a working relationship with Mike Kinsella, who would later go on to release albums as Owen, Joan of Arc, and Their / They're / There on Polyvinyl.

2000-2009

In 2001, Knight and Lunsford moved the label from Danville, IL to Urbana-Champaign, IL to give Polyvinyl a better infrastructure to grow. Such growth led to the Polyvinyl 2003 Winter Tour, which commenced right after the January release of Rainer Maria’s Long Knives Drawn. Rainer Maria and Mates of State went out on the road with fellow labelmates Owen and Saturday Looks Good to Me. Later that year, Polyvinyl released the video of Rainer Maria’s Winter Tour set at Chapel Hill’s Cat’s Cradle and Mates of State’s third record, Team Boo.

In 2004, Polyvinyl began to be distributed by Alternative Distribution Alliance and added Athens’ of Montreal to the label family. of Montreal released their first album with Polyvinyl, Satanic Panic in the Attic, the same year.

Polyvinyl celebrated its 10th anniversary in 2006 with a concert featuring Headlights, of Montreal, Owen, and Someone Still Loves You Boris Yeltsin in Urbana, IL. The following year, Polyvinyl released Architecture in Helsinki’s Places Like This and of Montreal’s critically acclaimed Hissing Fauna, Are You The Destroyer?, the best-selling album in Polyvinyl history.

Polyvinyl closed out the decade in 2009 with the release of Japandroids’ debut full-length, Post-Nothing.

2010-Present

Polyvinyl’s 2011 15th anniversary bash expanded on its previous anniversary show with a nine-band bill including Asobi Seksu, Braid, Deerhoof, Japandroids, Joan of Arc, Owen, Someone Still Loves You Boris Yeltsin, STRFKR, and Xiu Xiu. Polyvinyl moved into their 16th year with the release of Japandroids’ Celebration Rock.

In 2014, Polyvinyl released another best-seller, Alvvays’ self-titled debut, and leading up to the label’s 20th anniversary, Polyvinyl expanded to a bigger location in Champaign in Spring 2015. After the label’s move, Beach Slang released their debut full-length that autumn.

In 2016, the label celebrated its 20th anniversary. To commemorate the occasion, Polyvinyl released a compilation titled Polyvinyl Plays Polyvinyl, on which twenty Polyvinyl artists covered songs by their labelmates. With the help of Girl Skateboards and artist Jesse LeDoux, Polyvinyl also created a skateboard deck as a symbol of skate culture’s influence on Matt Lunsford’s musical discovery and the label’s early identity development.

2017 brought the release of sophomore records from White Reaper and Alvvays, The World's Best American Band and Antisocialites, respectively, as well as Jay Som’s first proper record for Polyvinyl, Everybody Works. All three albums closed out the year with spots on several year-end publication lists, including Pitchfork, NPR, Stereogum, and Paste.

At the start of 2018, Polyvinyl committed to donate 10% of mailorder revenue one Friday per month to deserving causes, especially organizations that strive to make progress in music communities. Donation recipients have included the Tegan and Sara Foundation, OurMusicMyBody, and Girls Rock! Champaign-Urbana.

In February 2018, Polyvinyl announced a partnership with Brooklyn-based independent label Double Double Whammy. Double Double Whammy, which started in 2011 as a project to release the founders’ project, LVL UP, has a catalog that includes Mitski, Frankie Cosmos, Yowler, Ó, Hatchie, and Florist, among others. Through this partnership, Polyvinyl provides distribution, accounting, webstore fulfillment, and other shared services, while Double Double Whammy maintains creative autonomy.

Current roster

Alvvays
American Football
Anamanaguchi
Antarctigo Vespucci
Anna Burch
Diane Coffee
The Dodos
Chris Farren
Jacco Gardner
Generationals

The Get Up Kids
Grapetooth
Hazel English
IAN SWEET
Julia Jacklin
Jay Som
Kero Kero Bonito
Laura Jane Grace
Man on Man
Oceanator
of Montreal

Owen
Palehound
Pedro the Lion
Post Animal
Jeff Rosenstock
Shy Boys
Squirrel Flower
STRFKR
Xiu Xiu
Yumi Zouma

Full roster

31Knots
Aloha
Alvvays
AM/FM
American Football 
Anamanaguchi
Antarctigo Vespucci
Architecture in Helsinki
Asobi Seksu
Ativin
Audible
Beach Slang
Birthmark
Braid
Anna Burch
Cale Parks
Casiokids
Collections of Colonies of Bees
Corm

Decibully
Deerhoof
Diane Coffee
The Dodos
Dusted
FAN
Chris Farren
Faux Hoax
Kaia Fischer
Friction
Jacco Gardner
Generationals
The Get Up Kids
Grapetooth
Hail Social
Hazel English 
Headlights
IAN SWEET 
Ida
The Ivory Coast
Julia Jacklin

James Husband
Japandroids
Jay Som
Joan of Arc
Justus Proffit & Jay Som
Katy Goodman & Greta Morgan
Kero Kero Bonito
Kerosene 454
La Sera
Ladyhawke
Laura Jane Grace
The Like Young
Loney Dear
Love Is All
The M's
Man on Man
Mates of State

Matt Pond PA
Mister Heavenly 
Momma
Oceanator
of Montreal
The One Up Downstairs
Owen
Owls
Painted Palms
Palehound
Paris, Texas
Cale Parks
Pedro The Lion
Pele
Pet Symmetry
Phantastic Ferniture

Picastro
Pillar Point
Post Animal
Psychic Twin
Quiet Slang
Radiation City
Radio Flyer
Rainer Maria
The Red Hot Valentines
The Rentals
Jeff Rosenstock
Saturday Looks Good To Me
Shy Boys
Someone Still Loves You Boris Yeltsin
Sonny & The Sunsets
Squirrel Flower
Stagnant Pools

STRFKR
Sunday's Best
Tancred
Their / They're / There
Fred Thomas
Shugo Tokumaru
Tu Fawning
Vivian Girls
Volcano, I'm Still Excited!!
Wampire
White Reaper
xbxrx
Xiu Xiu
Yumi Zouma
ZZZZ

See also
 Polyvinyl Record Co. discography
 List of Polyvinyl Record Co. artists

References

External links
 Official Polyvinyl site
 BreakThru Radio - Featured Label Article
 BIRP! Interview with Polyvinyl Label Manager Seth Hubbard

American independent record labels
Record labels established in 1995
1995 establishments in the United States
Companies based in Illinois
Indie rock record labels
Indie pop record labels
Alternative rock record labels